The Second Victory is a 1958 novel by Morris West. It was also known as Backlash.

Premise
In post war Austria, Major Mark Hanlon, Occupation Commander of the alpine town of Bad Quellenberg, investigates the murder of his driver.

Reception

Film Version
Universal Pictures bought the film rights and West wrote the script in the late 1950s. In November 1958 Henry Denker was hired to write the script, for producer Robert Arthur, by which time the title had changed to A Gathering of Eagles. However no movie resulted until 1987.

References

1958 novels
Works by Morris West